Benedikt Martin Dorsch (born 10 January 1981) is a professional tennis player from Germany.

Career
Dorsch was at Baylor University from 2002 to 2005 and was a member of the Baylor team that claimed the national championship in 2004. A three-time singles and doubles All-American, Dorsch won the Intercollegiate Tennis Association Player of the Year award in 2004 and 2005. He was the NCAA Division 1 singles champion in his final year. The German then committed himself to the international tennis circuit.

He has only been able to qualify once for the main draw of a Grand Slam tournament once, which was at the 2006 Wimbledon Championships. In the opening round he faced former Wimbledon semi-finalist Xavier Malisse, who won in straight sets.

Despite having a win over Rainer Schüttler in the qualifying round for the 2007 Sony Ericsson Open (Miami Masters), Dorsch didn't manage to make it into the main draw. He did however feature in the doubles, with Horia Tecău. The pair lost in the opening round to Tomáš Berdych and Ivan Ljubičić, in a match decided by a super tie-break.

In 2008 he appeared in the main draw of two ATP World Tour tournaments, the Qatar Open, where he lost in the first round to top seed Nikolay Davydenko and the SAP San Jose Open, where he was beaten in the opening round by Bobby Reynolds.

He has won four Challenger titles during his career, two each in singles and doubles, as well as finishing runner-up a further 10 times, again split evenly between singles and doubles.

ATP Challenger and ITF Futures finals

Singles: 11 (5–6)

Doubles: 11 (3–8)

Performance timeline

Singles

References

External links
 
 
 

1981 births
Living people
German male tennis players
Baylor Bears men's tennis players
Sportspeople from Garmisch-Partenkirchen
Tennis people from Bavaria